The 1961 Memphis State Tigers football team represented Memphis State College (now known as the University of Memphis) as an independent during the 1961 NCAA University Division football season. In its fourth season under head coach Billy J. Murphy, the team compiled an 8–2 record and outscored opponents by a total of 332 to 75. Don Coffey and Jack Carter were the team captains. The team played its home games at Crump Stadium in Memphis, Tennessee.

The team's statistical leaders included James Earl Wright with 604 passing yards, fullback Dave Casinelli with 646 rushing yards and 54 points scored, and Don Coffey with 312 receiving yards.

Schedule

References

Memphis State
Memphis Tigers football seasons
Memphis State Tigers football